The Iranian Volleyball Super League 2017–18 was the 31st season of the Iranian Volleyball Super League, the highest professional volleyball league in Iran.

Regular season

Standings

Shams Tehran was docked 3 points due to the lack of participation in the youth league.

Results

Playoffs
All times are Iran Standard Time (UTC+03:30).
All series were the best-of-three format.

Quarterfinals
Sarmayeh Bank Tehran vs. Havash Gonbad

Shahrdari Varamin vs. Paykan Tehran

Saipa Tehran vs. Khatam Ardakan

Shahrdari Tabriz vs. Kalleh Mazandaran

Semifinals
Sarmayeh Bank Tehran vs. Paykan Tehran

Khatam Ardakan vs. Shahrdari Tabriz

3rd place
Paykan Tehran vs. Shahrdari Tabriz

The 3rd place playoffs between Shahrdari Tabriz and Paykan Tehran, initially scheduled for 7, 11 and 14(if necessary) March, were canceled by mutual agreement. The two teams shared the 3rd place.

Final
Sarmayeh Bank Tehran vs. Khatam Ardakan

Final standings

Champions Sarmayeh Bank Tehran dissolved in March 2018, so runners-up Khatam Ardakan qualified for 2018 Asian Club Championship.

References

External links
Iran Volleyball Federation

League 2017-18
Iran Super League, 2017-18
Iran Super League, 2017-18
Volleyball League, 2017-18
Volleyball League, 2017-18